For the 2010–11 season, Inverness Caley Thistle compete in the Scottish Premier League, having been promoted as champions of the Scottish First Division in 2009–10. They reached the quarter finals of the Scottish Cup, and the third round of the League Cup, before being eliminated by Celtic in both competitions.

Results and fixtures

Scottish Premier League

Final league table

Scottish Cup

Scottish League Cup

Current squad

Transfers

Captains

Hat-tricks

References

External links 
Inverness Fixture List 

Inverness Caledonian Thistle F.C. seasons
Inverness Caledonian Thistle